Doug Allen (born 1956) is an American cartoonist.

Doug Allen may also refer to:

 Doug Allen (American football) (born 1951), American football player
 Doug Allen (actor), British actor

See also
 Doug Allan (born 1951), Scottish wildlife cameraman and photographer